"When You Come Back to Me" is a song recorded by Australian artist and actor Jason Donovan. It was released on 27 November 1989 as the first single from his second album  Between the Lines. It charted in the UK on 9 December 1989, peaking at Number 2 the following week and returning to the same position in January 1990, becoming one of his biggest selling singles.

Background
As with all Donovan's early recordings, "When You Come Back to Me" was written and produced by the production team Stock, Aitken & Waterman. In addition, Matt Aitken contributed guitar; Mike Stock provided backing vocals, and both played keyboards on the track.

An instrumental version and three remixes augmented the standard edit for the single release.

Track listings
7" single (PWL46)

Side 1. “When You Come Back To Me”- 3:31

Side 2. “When You Come Back To Me (Instrumental)*”- 3:33

7" single poster bag (PWLP46)

Side 1. “When You Come Back To Me (The Yuletide Sleigh List Mix Mix)" — 4:40

Side 2. “When You Come Back To Me (Instrumental)*”- 3:33

7" single picture disc (PWLX46)

Side 1. “When You Come Back To Me”- 3:31

Side 2. “When You Come Back To Me (Instrumental)*”- 3:33

12" single (PWLT46)

Side 1. "When You Come Back To Me (Extended)" — 5:48

Side 2. 1. "When You Come Back To Me (No Probs Mix)" — 5:34

2. “When You Come Back To Me (Instrumental)*" — 3:33

Cassette Single (PWMC46)

1. "When You Come Back To Me" — 3:31

2. "When You Come Back To Me (Instrumental)*" — 3:33

CD Single (PWCD46)

1. When You Come Back To Me" — 3:31

2. When You Come Back To Me (Extended)" — 5:48)

3. "When You Come Back To Me (Instrumental)*" — 3:33

*Mixed by Dave Ford. This was not the instrumental of the single version to which it accompanied.  Rather, a stripped back guitar orientated version, identified on the 2009 iTunes releases as the “Guitar Instrumental”.

Charts

Weekly charts

Year-end charts

Certifications

References

1989 singles
Jason Donovan songs
Songs written by Pete Waterman
Songs written by Matt Aitken
Songs written by Mike Stock (musician)
Dance-pop songs
Song recordings produced by Stock Aitken Waterman
1989 songs
Pete Waterman Entertainment singles
Number-one singles in Finland
Irish Singles Chart number-one singles